Batrachedra theca is a moth in the family Batrachedridae. It is found in Mexico.

References

Natural History Museum Lepidoptera generic names catalog

Batrachedridae
Moths of Central America
Moths described in 1957